WFMA may refer to:

WFMA (FM), an American radio station
WFMA-LP, a defunct low-powered television station 
World Folk Music Association (WFMA), a non-profit organization